There are several Clark High Schools:

Anderson W. Clark Magnet High School, La Crescenta, California
Ed W. Clark High School, Las Vegas, Nevada
Clark Junior-Senior High School, Clark, South Dakota
George Rogers Clark Jr./Sr. High School (Hammond, IN), Hammond, Indiana
George Rogers Clark High School (Kentucky), Winchester, Kentucky
Joseph S. Clark High School, New Orleans, Louisiana
Clark School (Rowley, Massachusetts)
Clark Montessori High School, Cincinnati, Ohio
Clark High School (Plano, Texas)
Sheldon Clark High School, Inez, Kentucky
Tom C. Clark High School, San Antonio, Texas
Michele Clark Magnet High School, Chicago, Illinois

See also
 Clarke High School (disambiguation)
 Clark County High School (disambiguation)